In systems engineering, the tricotyledon theory of system design (T3SD) is a mathematical theory of system design developed by A. Wayne Wymore. T3SD consists of a language for describing systems and requirements, which is based on set theory, a mathematical systems model based on port automata, and a precise definition of the different types of system requirements and relationships between requirements.

System requirements model 
 I/O requirement
 Performance requirement
 System test requirement
 Cost requirement
 Tradeoff requirement

System design 
 Based on set theory
 Transition systems
 Functional system design
 Buildable system design

References 

Systems engineering